Auditorium Hotel may refer to:

in the United States
(by state)
 Auditorium Building, which formerly included Auditorium Hotel, at University of Chicago, in Chicago, Illinois
Robert E. Lee Hotel (St. Louis, Missouri), known also as Auditorium Hotel, listed on the NRHP in Missouri